Montana is a 2014 British action film directed by Mo Ali set in the East End of London starring McKell David as the title character in his first lead role in a feature film. He has since been in the TV series Holby City as Lloyd Kramer. The score was composed by Toydrum.

Plot 
A 14-year-old drug-runner called Montana (McKell David) gets haunted by crime lord Lazarus. Facing death, he is rescued by ex-Serbian Commando Dimitrije (Lars Mikkelsen), a man with a dark past who wants to destroy Lazarus and his criminal empire. Dimitrije trains Montana to be an assassin, and they plan their revenge on Lazarus to wipe him out for good.

Cast 

 McKell David as Montana
 Lars Mikkelsen as Dimitrije
 Michelle Fairley as DCI Rachel Jones
 Duane Henry as Junior
 Dominique Tipper as Mohawk
 Ashley Walters as Ryan
 Alexandra Weaver as Danica
 Kedar Williams-Stirling as Lorenzo
 Oliver Stark as Cal
 Zlatko Buric as Slavko
 Adam Deacon as Pitt
 Ryan Oliva as Branko
 Richie Campbell as Isaac
Sinead Michael as Jess(another citation)
 Rocky Marshall as DC Liam West
 Darrell D'Silva as Lazarus
 Eddie Bagayawa as The Chinaman

Production 
Shooting of the film took six weeks on locations all over London, including Hackney, Poplar, Brick Lane, Whitechapel, Greenwich, during February and March 2013.

On casting of McKell David, director Mo Ali said: "From the first time I met McKell David, I knew I'd found my Montana."

Review from Independent reads: "Director Mo Ali has an obvious flair for action – but little instinct for story or characterisation. At times, his new film plays like an episode of Grange Hill, as if directed by Quentin Tarantino."

Reception 
Empire Magazine gave it 3/5 stars in their review: "Tougher than a box of nails, this is a brassy revenge thriller that refuses to pull its punches."

References

External links 
 

2014 films
2010s English-language films
British action thriller films
British crime thriller films
2014 crime drama films
2014 crime thriller films
2014 action thriller films
Films set in London
2014 drama films
Films about the Serbian Mafia
2010s British films